Hohensax ( or ) is a ruined castle in the Sennwald municipality in the Swiss canton St. Gallen.
The castle was built around 1200 by the barons of Sax, and was destroyed in 1446.
In 1248, the castle passed to Ulrich von Sax, founder of the Sax-Hohensax line of the noble family. 
The castle was plundered in a feud of 1393, and sold together with the villages of Sax and Gams to the dukes of Austria. 
In the Old Zürich War, the people of Appenzell captured and slighted the castle in 1446.
After this, the barons of Hohensax resided in the nearby Forstegg castle at Salez. 
In 1640, the ruin passed to the barony of  Sax-Forstegg,  one of the constituent parts of the canton of Linth of the Helvetic Republic in 1798, and later the canton of St. Gallen.
It included the villages of Sax, Salez and Gams.

Gallery

See also
 List of castles in Switzerland

References

 Jakob Obrecht: «Die Bauuntersuchung an Turm und Schildmauer der Ruine Hohensax, Sennwald SG, 2008». In: Mittelalter. Zeitschrift des Schweizerischen Burgenvereins. 14. Jhg. / Nr. 4. Basel 2009.

Castles in the canton of St. Gallen
Ruined castles in Switzerland
Buildings and structures demolished in the 15th century
1200 establishments in Europe
12th-century establishments in Switzerland
1446 disestablishments in Europe
15th-century disestablishments in Switzerland